The La Palma chaffinch (Fringilla coelebs palmae), also known as the Palman chaffinch or, locally in Spanish as the pinzón palmero or pinzón hembra, is a small passerine bird in the finch family Fringillidae. It is a subspecies of the common chaffinch that is endemic to La Palma in the Canary Islands, a Spanish archipelago that forms part of Macaronesia in the North Atlantic Ocean.

Taxonomy 
Suárez et al. (2009) found, in a genetic analysis of chaffinches Fringilla coelebs in the Canary Islands that at least three subspecies are present there: F. c. palmae occurs on La Palma in the western Canary Archipelago, F. c. canariensis on La Gomera and Tenerife. The form on El Hierro is F. c. ombriosa, and a fourth, hitherto undescribed taxon previously assigned to F. c. canariensis, on Gran Canaria. Other Macaronesian subspecies occur in the Azores (F. c. moreletti) and on Madeira (F. c. maderensis).

References

Notes

Sources 
 
 

Birds described in 1889
Birds of the Canary Islands
Endemic fauna of the Canary Islands
Fringilla
Taxa named by Henry Baker Tristram